A pulmonary thrombectomy is an emergency surgical procedure used to remove blood clots from the pulmonary arteries.

Mechanical thrombectomies can be surgical (surgical thrombectomy) or percutaneous (percutaneous thrombectomy).

Surgical thrombectomies were once popular but were abandoned because of poor long-term outcomes. Recently, in selected patients, they have gone through a resurgence with the revision of the surgical technique.

Relation to PTE
Pulmonary thrombectomies and pulmonary thromboendarterectomies (PTEs) are both operations that remove thrombus. Aside from this similarity they differ in many ways.  
PTEs are done on a nonemergency basis while pulmonary thrombectomies are typically done as an emergency procedure. 
PTEs typically are done using hypothermia and full cardiac arrest.
PTEs are done for chronic pulmonary embolism, thrombectomies for severe acute pulmonary embolism.
PTEs are generally considered a very effective treatment, surgical thrombectomies are an area of some controversy and their effectiveness a matter of some debate in the medical community.

See also
Pulmonary embolism
Heart-lung machine

References

External links

Pulmonary thoracic surgery